

The CAP-4 Paulistinha was a military and civilian trainer aircraft built in Brazil during the 1930s and 1940s. It was originally developed by Empresa Aeronáutica Ypiranga (EAY) as an unlicensed copy of the Taylor Cub powered by a Salmson 9Ad radial engine.  It featured a high strut-braced wing, two enclosed tandem seats, and a steel-tube fuselage with fabric covering.  Its tailwheel undercarriage was not retractable.

EAY had built five examples by the time that the firm was purchased by Companhia Aeronáutica Paulista (CAP) in 1942.  CAP continued manufacturing the type under the designation CAP-4.

The type was widely successful, with nearly 800 units being produced for Brazil's flying clubs and armed forces, as well as for export to Argentina, Paraguay, Chile, Uruguay and Portugal.  At the time of peak production in 1943, a new CAP-4 left the factory every day, and production continued until 1948.

In 1956, Sociedade Aeronáutica Neiva (Neiva) acquired the rights renaming it to P-56 Paulistinha, the design was used as the basis for an agricultural aircraft, the P-56 Agricola, adding a fibreglass chemical hopper and spraybars, but this was unable to compete with imported, purpose-built agricultural aircraft.

Variants
EAY-201original radial engined version
CAP-4main production version
CAP-4Bair ambulance version (2 prototypes built)
CAP-4Cartillery-spotting version, (Paulistinha Rádio or Paulistinha Observação)
P-56 Agricolaagricultural version by Neiva (60 built)
Paulistinha 56-CPowered by  Continental C-90-8F/12F engine. 256 built by Neiva between 1958 and 1964.
P56C-1 Paulistinha Rebocador
Paulistinha 56-DMore powerful version with  Lycoming O-320-A1A. Single prototype built, which was designated L-6A by Brazilian Air Force. No production.

Operators

Brazilian Navy

Paraguayan Military Aviation 4 aircraft bought in the early 1960s
Paraguayan Aeroclub 4 aircraft bought in the 1950s

Specifications (CAP-4)

References
Notes

Bibliography
  
 
 
 Aeroclube de Joinville website

External links

 Brazilian Naval Air Arm - CAP Paulistinha

Paulistinha
Single-engined tractor aircraft
High-wing aircraft
1930s Brazilian military trainer aircraft
1930s Brazilian civil trainer aircraft
World War II military aircraft
Neiva aircraft
Aircraft first flown in 1935